Big Fun may refer to:

 "Big Fun (Kool & the Gang song)", 1982
 Big Fun, a song from the 2010 musical Heathers
 Big Fun, the U.S. version of the Inner City album Paradise
 "Big Fun" (Inner City song), the title song
 Big Fun (Miles Davis album), 1974
 Big Fun (Shalamar album), 1979
 Big Fun (Elvin Bishop album), 1988
 Big Fun (Towa Tei album), 2009
 Big Fun (C.C. Catch album), 1988
 Big Fun (band), a 1988–1994 UK group
 Big Fun, a fictional band in the 1988 film Heathers